Oku-sama wa Mahō Shōjo: Bewitched Agnes was produced by Media Factory, Toshiba Entertainment, J.C.Staff, Tram and Kids Station. It is directed by Hiroshi Nishikiori, with Yūji Matsukura, Kazuhiko Ikeguchi and Nishikiori himself handling series composition, Shinya Hasegawa designing the characters, Kenji Kondō and Takerō Sekijima composing the music and Chikako Shibata in charge of art direction. The series was initially broadcast in Japan in thirteen episodes between 4 July 2005 and 25 September 2005 on several television channels: Chiba TV, Kids Station, Sun TV, TV Aichi, TV Kanagawa, and TV Saitama.



Episode list

References

Oku-sama wa Maho Shojo: Bewitched Agnes